The Modern Greek Studies Association (MGSA) is a scholarly organization for modern Greek studies in North America.  It was founded in 1968.

It is interdisciplinary, covering language, history, politics, economics, society, and the arts of modern Greece, broadly defined.

It covers Greek history, society, politics, and culture from the late Byzantine period to the present. Choice Reviews has praised it as "a magnificent scholarly journal".

Its biennial symposia are a focus for scholars of modern Greece in North America.

List of presidents
The following have served as President of the Modern Greek Studies Association:.

 1970-73: Edmund Keeley
 1974-76: John A. Petropulos
 1977-79: A. Lily Macrakis
 1980-82: Edmund Keeley
 1983-85: Peter Bien
 1986-88: P. Nikiforos Diamandouros
 1988-90: Van Coufoudakis
 1991-92: Michael Herzfeld
 1993-95: Adamantia Pollis
 1995-97: John Chioles
 1997-99: Van Coufoudakis
 2000-02: Peter Bien
 2003-05: Thomas Gallant
 2006-11: Stathis Gourgouris
 2011-14: Gonda Van Steen
 2014-17: Neovi Karakatsanis
 2017-20: Franklin L. Hess

References

External links
MGSA official site
Journal of Modern Greek Studies official site; also available online at MUSE (by subscription)

Modern Greek studies
Learned societies of the United States